is a Japanese boxer. He competed in the men's light flyweight event at the 1972 Summer Olympics.

References

1949 births
2002 deaths
Japanese male boxers
Olympic boxers of Japan
Boxers at the 1972 Summer Olympics
Place of birth missing
Asian Games medalists in boxing
Boxers at the 1970 Asian Games
Asian Games bronze medalists for Japan
Medalists at the 1970 Asian Games
Light-flyweight boxers